Dr. Raul Geller (ראול גלר; born January 23, 1936) is a Peruvian-Israeli former professional footballer, who played as a forward, and an orthopedic surgeon. In Peru he played for Deportivo Municipal, Porvenir Miraflores, and the Peru national football team. In Israel, he is the third -leading scorer of all time of Beitar Jerusalem. His 0.64 goals per game ranks first. He also competed in soccer in the 1969 Maccabiah Games. In 2013, Geller was ranked #161 in the world in 75+ tennis by the International Tennis Federation.

Early life

Geller was born in Quillabamba, Peru. His father Marcus (Mordechai) played football in Poland, and fled it before the Holocaust to Peru. Geller as a child was a member of the youth movements Beitar and HaNoar HaTzioni. When he was 13, he and his family moved to Lima, Peru.

Career

Geller was a midfielder in football.  Geller played football in Peru for Deportivo Municipal (1956–59), Porvenir Miraflores (1960-64), and the Peru national football team (1964) at the 1964 Copa América.

He emigrated to Israel in January 1965. Geller played football in Israel for Beitar Jerusalem (1965–70; scoring 41 goals in 1966-67 and helping the club gain promotion to the Israeli top division). In 1971 he returned to the club for half a season. He is the third -leading scorer of all time of Beitar Jerusalem. His 0.64 goals per game ranks first.

Geller competed in the 1969 Maccabiah Games. He played football at the 1969 Maccabiah Games for Peru, which came in 8th.

Geller also worked as an orthopedic surgeon at Hadassah Ein Kerem, specializing in sports injuries.

In 2013, Geller was ranked #161 in the world in 75+ tennis by the International Tennis Federation.

References

External links
 
 Profile of Raul Geller on JewsInSports.org

1936 births
Living people
Association football forwards
Association football midfielders
Beitar Jerusalem F.C. players
Betar members
Competitors at the 1969 Maccabiah Games
Footballers from Lima
Israeli footballers
Israeli male tennis players
Israeli people of Polish-Jewish descent
Maccabiah Games footballers
Orthopedic surgeons
People from La Convención Province
Peruvian emigrants to Israel
Peruvian Jews
Peruvian male tennis players
Peruvian people of Polish-Jewish descent
Jewish footballers
Peruvian footballers
Peru international footballers
Deportivo Municipal footballers
Liga Leumit players